Casal Rotondo is the largest tomb on the Appian Way, to the southeast of Rome, Italy. A small farmhouse has been constructed on the top.

History
The structure is found at approximately the VIth mile of the ancient Appian Way.  The name comes from the fact that the tomb is round and because a farmhouse (casale) was built on the top in the Middle Ages, when it belonged to the Savelli family and was one of a system of watchtowers along the Appian Way. The mausoleum dates from around 30 B.C.  It is a large circular building with a diameter of 35 m, decorated with a frieze and, originally, had a cone-shaped roof. The base offered seats where travellers could rest out of the sun.  
Near the mausoleum, the archaeologist Luigi Canina (1795-1856) built a brick wall containing architectural fragments. These were originally thought to have been from the Casal Rotondo but this is now disputed. Canina deduced from a small piece of inscription with the name "Cotta" that the monument had been built by M. Aurelius Cotta Messallinus for his father, Marcus Valerius Messalla Corvinus, but this inscription and other architectural fragments are now assumed to have come from a smaller monument at the site, and they may have nothing to do with Messalla Corvinus.

See also
List of ancient monuments in Rome

References

External links

Ancient Roman buildings and structures in Rome
Buildings and structures in Rome
Mausoleums in Rome